Rivellia quadrifasciata, the soybean nodule fly, is a species of signal flies (insects in the family Platystomatidae). Larvae are known to feed on Glycine max, Phaseolus limensi, Vigna unguiculata, and Desmodium plants.

References

Further reading

 

quadrifasciata
Articles created by Qbugbot
Insects described in 1835